The cracking pearlymussel (Hemistena lata) is an endangered species of freshwater mussel, an aquatic bivalve mollusk in the family Unionidae.

This species is native to the United States, where it remains only in Tennessee and Virginia. It was originally distributed in the Ohio River, Cumberland River and Tennessee River systems, but it has been extirpated from most of its previous range.

Parmalee and Bogan reported that there were still populations in the Clinch River in Tennessee. Other populations that are known to survive are located in the Powell and Elk Rivers.

Shell description
These mussels have thin, fairly weak, elongated shells.

Ecology
This species spends its adult life buried under the sand or mud in the bottom of medium-sized, flowing rivers. The females capture sperm released into the water by males. They store the sperm until they need them to fertilize their eggs. After fertilization, the females release the larvae into the river where the larvae attach to fish. Once the larva mature into juveniles with shells, they leave their host fish and drop to the sediment where they bury themselves. This process, therefore, requires an environment with ample fish to act as hosts. They prefer relatively shallow (usually less than 2 ft deep) water with a moderate current.

Conservation
The main threats to the continued existence of this species are habitat changes due to damming of rivers, silting of rivers due to erosion caused by construction, farming and logging, and poisoning due to agricultural and industrial pollution. The U.S. Fish and Wildlife Service has created a recovery plan for this species.

References

Unionidae
Bivalves described in 1820
Molluscs of North America
Taxa named by Constantine Samuel Rafinesque
ESA endangered species